Istgah-e Gor Gor (also Romanized as Īstgāh-e Gor Gor and Īstgāh-e Gargar; also known as Gargar) is a village in Jarahi Rural District, in the Central District of Mahshahr County, Khuzestan Province, Iran. At the 2006 census, its population was 49, in 9 families.

References 

Populated places in Mahshahr County